The 1960 All-Ireland Minor Hurling Championship was the 30th staging of the All-Ireland Minor Hurling Championship since its establishment by the Gaelic Athletic Association in 1928.

Tipperary entered the championship as the defending champions.

On 4 September 1960 Kilkenny won the championship following a 7-12 to 1-11 defeat of Tipperary in the All-Ireland final. This was their fifth All-Ireland title and their first in ten championship seasons.

Results

Leinster Minor Hurling Championship

Final

Munster Minor Hurling Championship

Final

Leinster Minor Hurling Championship

Semi-finals

Final

Ulster Minor Hurling Championship

Final

All-Ireland Minor Hurling Championship

Semi-final

Final

External links
 All-Ireland Minor Hurling Championship: Roll Of Honour

Minor
All-Ireland Minor Hurling Championship